Raphaël Clapson (born 23 September 1973 in Le Havre) is a French professional football player who last played in the Championnat de France amateur for USL Dunkerque.

He played on the professional level in Ligue 1 for Le Havre AC.

External links
 

1973 births
Living people
Footballers from Le Havre
French footballers
Association football defenders
Ligue 1 players
Championnat National players
Le Havre AC players
ÉFC Fréjus Saint-Raphaël players
Clermont Foot players
FC Rouen players
USL Dunkerque players